Wen Jia (born 28 February 1989) is a Chinese table tennis player.

Achievements

ITTF Tours
Women's singles

Women's doubles

References

Table tennis players from Liaoning
Sportspeople from Dandong
1989 births
Living people
Chinese female table tennis players